For sure or its variations may refer to: 
For Sure! (Woody Shaw album), 1979
For Sure! (Kenny Drew album), 1978
"For Sure", the title track from the Kenny Drew album
"For Sure" (Scooch song), 2000
"For Sure", a song by American Football from their self-titled 1999 album
"For Sure", a song by Carly Rae Jepsen from Dedicated
"For Sure", a song by Future Islands from As Long as You Are